The Omdurman Bridge (also known as the Redemption Bridge or the Old White Nile Bridge) is a steel truss bridge in Sudan on the road connecting Khartoum on the White Nile to Omdurman.

History
The bridge was built between 1924 and 1926 by Dorman Long from Teesside, England: it is 613 metres long and is supported by seven pairs of round pillars.

References

Bridges in Sudan
Bridges completed in 1926
1926 establishments in Sudan